José  Valentin Tormos Diego (2 November 1890 – 24 August 1977) was a Puerto Rican politician and Mayor of Ponce, Puerto Rico, from 1937 to 1941. He is best remembered for under his administration the Puerto Rican Nationalist Party received a permit for a peaceful march, which resulted in the Ponce massacre by Insular Police under authority supplied by US President Franklin Delano Roosevelt to Governor Blanton Winship. During his administration he also rebuilt the historic Teatro La Perla, and reconditioned the Teatro La Perla northern annex to be used as headquarters of the municipal public library.

Early years
Tormos Diego was the son of Joaquin Tormos and Catalina Diego. Tormos Diego married Amparo Vega Nevárez on 25 September 1911, in Vega Alta, Puerto Rico, and they had 6 children: Carmen Amparo, Nelida Mercedes, Ana Luisa, Aida, José, and Gloria. One of his children, José G. Tormos Vega, was also mayor of Ponce.

Mayoral selection
Antonio M. Delgado had been elected mayor of Ponce, Puerto Rico in 1936. However he died before taking office. Jose Tormos Diego was selected by the standing political party to replace Mr. Delgado.

Mayoral term
Tormos fell ill of appendicitis during his second year as mayor, in July 1938, and had surgery at a Washington, D.C., area hospital.

Tormos Diego is best known for under his administration the Puerto Rican Nationalist Party received a permit for a peaceful march, which resulted in the Ponce massacre by Insular Police under authority supplied by US President Franklin Delano Roosevelt to Governor Blanton Winship.

Death and legacy
Tormos Diego died on 24 August 1977. The cause of his death was "cirrhosis of the liver", and he was buried at Cementerio Católico San Vicente de Paul in Ponce.

During his mayoral administration he rebuilt the historic Teatro La Perla in 1940. During the project he also reconditioned the Teatro La Perla northern annex to be used as headquarters of the municipal public library. In Ponce there is also a public housing development named after him.

See also
Ponce, Puerto Rico
List of Puerto Ricans

References

Further reading
 Fay Fowlie de Flores. Ponce, Perla del Sur: Una Bibliográfica Anotada. Second Edition. 1997. Ponce, Puerto Rico: Universidad de Puerto Rico en Ponce. p. 173. Item 880. 
 Carnaval de Ponce: programa. Ponce, Puerto Rico. 196x? - . Includes photos. (Archivo Histórico Municipal de Ponce, AHMP; Colegio Universitario Tecnológico de Ponce, CUTPO)
 Fay Fowlie de Flores. Ponce, Perla del Sur: Una Bibliografía Anotada. Segunda Edición. 1997. Ponce, Puerto Rico: Universidad de Puerto Rico en Ponce. p. 379. Item 1865. 
 German Castanera Gomez. "Cualquier alcalde hubiese actuado como Tormos Diego." El Diluvio. 26 de enero de 1938. p. 11. (CUTPO)
 Fay Fowlie de Flores. Ponce, Perla del Sur: Una Bibliografía Anotada. Segunda Edición. 1997. Ponce, Puerto Rico: Universidad de Puerto Rico en Ponce. p. 26. Item 126. 
 "Edificios públicos en Ponce." Puerto Rico Ilustrado. 5 de noviembre de 1938. p. 30. Includes photo of Jose Tormos Diego. (CUTPO)

1890 births
1977 deaths
Burials at Cementerio Católico San Vicente de Paul
Mayors of Ponce, Puerto Rico
People from Bayamón, Puerto Rico